The '''Yamaha OX99-11 V12''' was a sports car project designed by Yamaha's subsidiary Ypsilon Technology and IAD, an English engineering consultancy, which was supposed to enter production in 1994.

Yamaha began competing in Formula One as an engine supplier to the Zakspeed team in 1989, and using the experience it had gained during that time it wanted to build a price-no-object car based on actual Formula One technology. Even though the Formula One project was doing poorly in competition, by 1991 the team had just produced a new engine, the OX99, which was supplied to the Brabham team. Yamaha then approached a German company to design an initial version of the car. Yamaha was not pleased with the result as it was too similar to sport cars of that time, so it contacted IAD to continue working on the project. By the beginning of 1992, just under 12 months after starting to work on the project, IAD came with an initial version of the car. The car's design was undertaken by Takuya Yura, and was originally conceived as a single seater. However Yamaha requested a two-seater vehicle, and a tandem seating arrangement was suggested, which was in keeping with Yamaha's motorcycle expertise. This resulted in a radical and somewhat outrageous design (inspired by Group C race cars like Mazda 717C), like its cockpit-looking roof. Other notable specs were the same carbon fiber chassis and OX99 engine as the F1 car, essentially providing the closest experience of a pure racing car to the consumer market. The Yamaha OX99-11 features 1 canopy door that replaces the 2 conventional doors that swing outward.

However, disagreements between IAD and Yamaha over the budget made Yamaha take the project to its own Ypsilon Technology, which was given six months to finish the project, otherwise it would be terminated. To make matters worse, Japan was at that time in the midst of a financial crisis, which led Yamaha to believe it wouldn't be able to find any customers for the car, which was expected to have an $800,000 price tag (over $1.53 million in 2021 dollars).

Eventually the project was delayed until 1994, before finally being cancelled. A total of three prototypes were built by IAD. Of all the 3 OX99-11 supercars made, one is green, another one is red and the third a black unit.

External links 

 Interview with IAD's Dave Sullivan with pictures
 Specifications #1
 Specifications #2
 Rare Yamaha OX99-11 Is The F1-Powered Supercar You (Probably) Didn’t Know Existed

OX99-11
Sports cars
Coupés
Concept cars
First car made by manufacturer
Rear mid-engine, rear-wheel-drive vehicles